Nimra College of Engineering and Technology (NCET) is a private, minority institution, established by Nimra Educational Society in 1997 to offer undergraduate and post graduate education in engineering and technology.

The college is situated on the National Highway 9 (Vijayawada-Hyderabad) near Ibrahimpatnam, 17 km away from the Vijayawada in Andhra Pradesh. NCET is recognized and known as one of the best college for engineering education in Costal Andhra. It offers full-time education and training in five branches of engineering at Under Graduate (UG) level, and seven courses at Post Graduate (PG) level with a yearly intake of 420 and 210 respectively.

Management
NCET is established by a Muslim minority i.e. NIMRA Educational Society, founded in 1991, under A.P. registration Act of 1350 Fasli, [5] by Late Dr. Md. Vizarath Rasool Khan.

The institute is administered by secretary and correspondent Dr. Md. Saqib Rasool Khan and Principal Dr. Y. Sudheer Babu.

Affiliations
NCET is approved by All India Council for Technical Education AICTE, New Delhi. 
NCET is permitted by the Govt. of Andhra Pradesh.  
NCET is affiliated with Jawaharlal Nehru Technological University, Kakinada. 
NCET is certified with Muslim minority status by Minority Welfare Department, Govt. of AP, and is ISO 9001:2000 Certified.

References

Engineering colleges in Andhra Pradesh
Education in Vijayawada
Educational institutions established in 1997
1997 establishments in India